Crystal Lewis' Greatest Hits is the second greatest hits album by Crystal Lewis, released in 1995.

Track listing
"Come Just as You Are" (New song) — (4:26)
"Frustrated" (from Beyond the Charade) — (3:33)
"Precious Lord" (from Beyond the Charade) — (3:30)
"Bloodstained Pages" (from Joy) — (3:49)
"You Didn't Have to Do It" (from Joy) — (4:50)
"Let Love In" (from Let Love In) — (5:11)
"I Must Tell Jesus" (from Let Love In) — (5:02)
"Shine, Jesus, Shine" (from The Remix Collection) — (3:28)
"I Now Live" (from Remember) — (3:56)
"Remember" (from Remember) — (4:46)
"Only Fools" (from Remember) — (3:57)
"You'll Be Back for Me" (from The Bride) — (4:33)
"Amazing Grace" (from The Bride) — (4:40)
"My Redeemer Lives" (from The Bride) — (5:19)

References

Crystal Lewis albums
1995 greatest hits albums